Finland competed at the 2008 Summer Olympics in Beijing, People's Republic of China. The athletes were named in four selections: first took place on December 19, 2007, 2nd on April 16, 3rd on May 20 and 4th on July 21, 2008.

The goal of the Finnish Olympic team in the Beijing 2008 Olympic Games was three medals with at least one gold medal.

Shooter Juha Hirvi and dressage rider Kyra Kyrklund made Finnish olympic history by participating in their sixth Olympic Games. They shared the record with three winter Olympians: cross-country skiers Marja-Liisa Kirvesniemi and Harri Kirvesniemi and ice hockey player Raimo Helminen.

Medalists

Notes
Satu Mäkelä-Nummela's victory in women's trap was Finland's first ever gold medal in shotgun events at the Olympic Games. She became the third Finnish female athlete to win gold at the Summer Olympics, after Sylvi Saimo and Heli Rantanen.
Minna Nieminen's and Sanna Stén's silver medal in lightweight double sculls is Finland's first Olympic medal in rowing since 1984, when Pertti Karppinen won the last of his three consecutive Olympic gold medals.

Archery

Athletics

Men
Track & road events

Field events

Combined events – Decathlon

Women
Field events

Combined events – Heptathlon

* The athlete who finished in second place, Lyudmila Blonska of the Ukraine, tested positive for a banned substance. Both the A and the B tests were positive, therefore Blonska was stripped of her silver medal, and Kelo moved up a position.

Badminton

Canoeing

Sprint

Qualification Legend: QS = Qualify to semi-final; QF = Qualify directly to final

Diving

Equestrian

Dressage

Judo

Rowing

Women

Qualification Legend: FA=Final A (medal); FB=Final B (non-medal); FC=Final C (non-medal); FD=Final D (non-medal); FE=Final E (non-medal); FF=Final F (non-medal); SA/B=Semifinals A/B; SC/D=Semifinals C/D; SE/F=Semifinals E/F; QF=Quarterfinals; R=Repechage

Sailing

Men

Women

Open

M = Medal race; EL = Eliminated – did not advance into the medal race; CAN = Race cancelled;

Shooting

Men

Women

Swimming

Men

Women

Tennis

Men

Weightlifting

Wrestling

Men's Greco-Roman

See also
 Finland at the 2008 Summer Paralympics

References

External links
Finnish Team for Beijing 2008

Nations at the 2008 Summer Olympics
2008
O